The WS2500 is a 20-ton 10x8 or 10x10 special heavy duty truck used by the People's Liberation Army of the People's Republic of China. It is one of the principal mobility platforms in mounting China's medium-range ballistic missiles and other conventional missile assets.

It is a general purpose heavy duty truck/transported developed from the original WS2400 and is built by Wanshan Special Vehicle.

Description

As a more developed variant of the WS2400, the WS2500 was introduced in 2000  and is capable of mounting more advance and sophisticated MRBMs such as the DF-16s, rather than the much older DF-11 SRBM system. Due to the much larger missile payload - 1,000–1,500 kg more than previous models - the WS2500 is generally much larger and heavier than the older WS2400, in order to better accommodate a stable platform for the DF-16.

On the 70th anniversary of the People's Republic of China, a heavily modified variant of the WS2500 was seen carrying the DF-17 ballistic missile, armed with the DF-ZF Hypersonic Glide Vehicle.

The much larger WS2600 carries the larger DF-21C MRBMs.

Variants
WS2400
WS2600
WS2300

See also
DF-16
DF-17
DF-ZF

References

WS2400 Truck

Military trucks of China
Military vehicles of the People's Republic of China
Military vehicles introduced in the 2000s